The Song of Morgan is an album by avant-musician and singer/songwriter Jandek released, as with all Jandek albums, on Corwood Industries. The album is a box set, containing 9 CDs. Each disc contains a single piece for solo piano. There are no vocals on any of the pieces. The album sleeve depicts Jandek as a child and is the youngest photograph of "The Representative From Corwood Industries" that has been used as artwork for a Jandek album.

The pieces are all entitled "Nocturne" and numbered one to nine, shortest piece being "Nocturne Seven" at 51 minutes and the longest "Nocturne Three" at just over an hour.

Track listing

References

Jandek albums
Corwood Industries albums
2013 albums